Conflict is a TVB television series, premiered on October 2, 1978. The theme song "Conflict" was composed and arranged by Joseph Koo, lyricised by Wong Jim, and sung by Jenny Tseng.

References 

1970s Hong Kong television series
1978 Hong Kong television series debuts
1979 Hong Kong television series endings
TVB dramas
Cantonese-language television shows